Anastasia: Once Upon a Time is a 2020 American fantasy adventure film very loosely based on the legend of Grand Duchess Anastasia Nikolaevna of Russia. The film stars Armando Gutierrez as Grigori Rasputin, Jo Koy as Vladimir Lenin, Brandon Routh as Nicholas II and Emily Carey as Anastasia. The film was released through digital platforms on April 7, 2020.

Plot
Anastasia Romanova escapes through a portal created by her family's old friend Rasputin when her family is threatened by Vladimir Lenin, and she finds herself in the year 1988. However, she is unaware that Yara, an Enchantress working with Lenin, hypnotized Rasputin and sent him through another portal to capture her.

Anastasia is befriended by Megan, a young American girl who has only recently moved into town and feels lonely as she has no friends. Despite Anastasia's initially fragmentary grasp of English, she introduces herself to Megan as "Annie", aided by a necklace Rasputin gave her that glows when she is in the presence of someone she can trust. As Anastasia's grasp of English grows, Megan finds her a place to stay in a currently-vacant house near Megan's own, and the two even manage to befriend a pop star giving a concert in a nearby mall who helps buy Anastasia contemporary clothing.

Eventually, Anastasia is able to tell Megan the truth about herself when she finds a book on the Romanovs' fate, but is disturbed to learn of her family's apparent deaths. Trying to cheer Anastasia up, Megan offers her one of a pair of "Best Friend" bracelets she bought herself in the past and never had anyone to share with.

When the two girls go to a haunted house party on Halloween, Anastasia is captured by Rasputin when she and Megan are separated. The school bullies initially convince Megan that Anastasia left on her own, but when Megan sees a live local news report of a traffic accident, she spots Anastasia and Rasputin in the background and realizes what really happened. Tracking them to the park where she first met Anastasia, Megan is able to help distract Rasputin long enough for Anastasia to open a new portal, allowing her to go back to a few moments before her original trip into the future and help her family escape Lenin's forces, with Rasputin staying behind to buy them time to escape.

Back in 1988, Megan is once again depressed at the loss of her friend, but when her mother suggests she introduce herself to the new neighbors, she is overjoyed to realize that the grandmother of the new family next door is Anastasia herself. Anastasia offers to tell Megan everything that happened to her since their last meeting.

Cast
 Emily Carey as Grand Duchess Anastasia Nikolaevna
 Amiah Miller as Megan
 Brandon Routh as Tsar Nicholas II of All Russia
 Aliyah Moulden as Bliss
Armando Gutierrez as Grigori Rasputin
 Kendall Vertes as Beatrice 
 Donna Murphy as Yara the Enchantress
 Jo Koy as Vladimir Lenin
 Lee Tae-ri as Prince Lee
 Haley Swindal as Tsarina Alexandra Feodorovna, Empress of All Russia

Production
Principal production began in the summer of 2017 in Louisville, KY with the young stars filming the 1988 portion of the film. Shooting on the 1917 portion of the film started in August 2017 and concluded in April 2018 after a break in between filming locations of about 6 months due to the scheduling of its location the Rosecliff which was the same location used for the Great Gatsby and its actors Jo Koy and Brandon Routh.

Reception
The Dove Foundation said that the "film includes a strong message of friendship and sacrificial love." Russia Beyond lambasted the film highlighting the negative portrayal of Russians and its handling of the tragic true story.  Regarding the merits of the film itself, Tom Whitcomb at The Bozho reviewed the film negatively, writing, "The acting is wooden and uninspired; the shoddy accents make me understand why everyone in the HBO miniseries Chernobyl stayed British. The production design is phoned in. The script was in serious need of several rewrites."

References

External links
 

2020 films
2020 adventure films
2020 fantasy films
2020s fantasy adventure films
2020s English-language films
American fantasy adventure films
Cultural depictions of Grand Duchess Anastasia Nikolaevna of Russia
Films scored by Nami Melumad
2020s American films